Río Negro (English: Black River) is a Chilean city and commune in Osorno Province, Los Lagos Region. The city is located 38 km south of Osorno and 6 km west of  Route 5. It has an area of 1,266 km² and a population of 14,732 inhabitants (7,204 women and 7,528 men according to census 2002).

The commune is bordered on the north by Osorno and San Juan de la Costa, on the east by Puerto Octay, on the west by the Pacific Ocean, and on the south by Purranque.

History 
In the 19th century, the commune was a property located between Chahuilco and Purranque called Curileufu by the Huilliche.  The town was founded on lands donated by Jose Miguel Alderete in the year 1896. The first alcalde (mayor) was Pedro González.

Demographics
Of these, 6,583 (44.7%) lived in urban areas and 8,149 (55.3%) in rural areas. The population fell by 8.1% (1294 persons) between the 1992 and 2002 censuses.

Administration
As a commune, Río Negro is a third-level administrative division of Chile administered by a municipal council, headed by an alcalde who is directly elected every four years. The 2008-2012 alcalde is Carlos Schwalm Urzúa (RN).  The council has the following members:
 Carlos Kusch (UDI)
 Pedro Carreño (PDC)
 Jaime Ramos (Ind.-PS)
 Patricio Alvarado (Ind.-RN)
 Juan Saldivia Quintullanca (Ind.-PRI)
 Rosiel del Río (Ind.-UDI)

Within the electoral divisions of Chile, Río Negro is represented in the Chamber of Deputies by Fidel Espinoza (PS) and Carlos Recondo (UDI) as part of the 56th electoral district, together with Puyehue, Purranque, Puerto Octay, Fresia, Frutillar, Llanquihue, Puerto Varas and Los Muermos. The commune is represented in the Senate by Camilo Escalona Medina (PS) and Carlos Kuschel Silva (RN) as part of the 17th senatorial constituency (Los Lagos Region).

Localities and sectors 
Riachuelo
Chifin
Huellelhue Beach
Huilma
Millantué
Chan-Chan
Chahuilco
Ñancuan
Tres Esteros
Río Blanco
El Bolsón

Climate 
The climate is oceanic (Köppen: Cfb), with average temperatures of 11.4 °C.

References

External links 
  Municipality of Rio Negro
  Austral Newspaper of Osorno
  Visiones de Rio Negro Magazine

Communes of Chile
Populated places established in 1896
Populated places in Osorno Province
1896 establishments in Chile